Chambeugle is a former commune in the Yonne department in Bourgogne-Franche-Comté in north-central France. On 1 January 2016, it was merged into the new commune of Charny-Orée-de-Puisaye.

See also
Communes of the Yonne department

References

Former communes of Yonne